Yilgarn-Dundas was an electoral district of the Legislative Assembly in the Australian state of Western Australia from 1977 to 1983.

The district was located in the Goldfields-Esperance region, and was based in Boulder and took in some Kalgoorlie suburbs, while extending west to Coolgardie and Southern Cross, and south to Kambalda and Norseman.

It existed for two terms of parliament, and was represented in that time by Labor member Julian Grill. Following the abolition of Yilgarn-Dundas at the 1983 state election, Grill became the member for Esperance-Dundas.

Members for Yilgarn-Dundas

Election results 

Yilgarn-Dundas
Constituencies established in 1977
1977 establishments in Australia
Constituencies disestablished in 1983
1983 disestablishments in Australia